Ewa Larsson (born 1952) is a Swedish Green Party politician, social scientist and Waldorf schoolteacher. She served as a member of the Riksdag from the constituency Stockholms kommun from 1994 to 2002.

References

1952 births
Living people
Members of the Riksdag from the Green Party
Women members of the Riksdag
Members of the Riksdag 1994–1998
Members of the Riksdag 1998–2002
21st-century Swedish women politicians
Swedish social scientists
Swedish schoolteachers